Arvind Pratap is an Indian politician, affiliated with Samajwadi Party and a former Member of Uttar Pradesh Legislative Council from Mathura-Etah-Mainpuri seat (2016–2022). 

His mother Geeta Devi was the sister of Ram Gopal Yadav. She died in August 2021.

Education and career
He did his graduation from Chaudhary Charan Singh Degree College, Heonra, Etawah of Chhatrapati Shahu Ji Maharaj University in 1998 and post graduation from K.K. Degree College, Etawah of Chhatrapati Shahu Ji Maharaj University in 2000. He also served as Block Pramukh of Karhal before becoming an MLC in 2016.

References

Members of the Uttar Pradesh Legislative Council
Living people
People from Uttar Pradesh
People from Mainpuri district
Samajwadi Party politicians
A
1973 births
A